Yarkin is a Russian surname. Notable people with the surname include:

Aleksandr Dmitriyevich Yarkin (born 1969), Russian footballer and coach
Aleksandr Yarkin (born 1986), Russian footballer
Anatoly Yarkin (born 1958), Soviet cyclist
Vladislav Yarkin (born 1965), Russian football player
Sarah Yarkin (born 1993), American actress

Russian-language surnames